Barunggam (Murrumningama) is an extinct Aboriginal language spoken by the Barunggam people of Queensland in Australia.
The Barunggam language shared many words with the neighboring languages, including Jarowair to the east, Wakka Wakka to the north and Mandandanji to the west.
Kite and Wurm describe Barunggam as a dialect of Wakka Wakka.

Tindale gives the traditional lands for the Barunggam who spoke the language as:"Headwaters of Condamine River east of Jackson to about Dalby; north about Charley Creek to Dividing Ranges and west to Wongorgera and Woleebee; south to Tara; at 165 Chinchilla and Jandowae. Their country is on the red soils south and west of the Dividing Range".

References

External links 
 Bibliography of Barunggam language and people resources, at the Australian Institute of Aboriginal and Torres Strait Islander Studies

Waka–Kabic languages
Extinct languages of Queensland